Sunrise Shores is an unincorporated community and census-designated place (CDP) in Henderson County, Texas, United States. It was first listed as a CDP prior to the 2020 census.

It is on the eastern side of the county, on the west shore of Lake Palestine, a reservoir on the Neches River.

References 

Census-designated places in Henderson County, Texas
Census-designated places in Texas